Andrzej Gryfita was the Bishop of Płock in Poland from 1239 until his death in 1244 AD. He was also known as Andrzej of Brzeźnica.

Family
He was brother of Klemens of Brzeźnica.

Career

He was elected Bishop in 1239 with the support of Bolesław, Duke of Masovia. As bishop he gained privileges from the Duke. He advocated for missions into Prussia and made grants to the Church in Zambskach.

Gryfita died on 7 January 1244. He was last mentioned in a document dated 4 August 1243, which was part of an ongoing legal action.

References

Bishops of Płock
Year of birth unknown
13th-century births
1244 deaths
13th-century Roman Catholic bishops in Poland
Gryfici (Świebodzice)